Zingiber matutumense  is a monocotyledonous plant species described by John Donald Mood and Ida Theilade. Zingiber matutumense is part of the genus Zingiber and the family Zingiberaceae.

Range
It is native to the Philippines.

References

matutumense